is a Japanese diver. She competed in two events at the 1976 Summer Olympics.

References

1955 births
Living people
Japanese female divers
Olympic divers of Japan
Divers at the 1976 Summer Olympics
Sportspeople from Hiroshima
Asian Games medalists in diving
Divers at the 1978 Asian Games
Asian Games bronze medalists for Japan
Medalists at the 1978 Asian Games
20th-century Japanese women